Auvert Bay is a bay  wide, indenting the coast for  between Cape Evensen and Cape Bellue, along the northwest coast of Stresher Peninsula, Graham Land in Antarctica. It was discovered by the French Antarctic Expedition, 1908–10, and named "Baie Auvert" ("bay far from anywhere").

References
 

Bays of Graham Land
Graham Coast